Elena Ghiba Birta (1801–1864) was an important protector of Romanian education in the west part of the country.

Background
Elena Ghiba-Birta was born in Bichiş (Bekes), her mother being born in Ineu. At just 10 years old she became an orphan, going to live with her relatives in Pâncota. When she got married, she moved to Arad. After only a few years she became a widow, but she kept the name Birta, from her marriage.

In 1830, she started working for Emanoil Gogher, a job she kept for 33 years later. At his death, she inherited his wealth.

Death
Elena Ghiba Birta died in January 1864, at Pesta, where she was being treated for an illness.

Legacy
Elena Ghiba Birta wrote her testament one year before her death, through which she made different donations. One of them was of 48,000 florins, for a foundation in her name. Out of that 12 scholarships were given annually, to students with less income, but deserving. Her name will always be remembered as a person whom helped students who were unable to pay for their studies.
The National College "Elena Ghiba-Birta" which bears her name today, stands opposite her bust.

References

External links

1801 births
1864 deaths
People from Mureș County
Romanian philanthropists
Patrons of schools
19th-century Romanian people
19th-century Romanian women
19th-century philanthropists
19th-century women philanthropists